Tahsis is a village municipality on the west coast of Vancouver Island, British Columbia, Canada, about  (by air) northwest of the provincial capital Victoria at . , the Canadian census listed 316 residents, a decline from the 2006 Census count of 366 residents. The Village of Tahsis economy used to be dependent on forestry, but after the closure of the local sawmill in 2001, the economy became heavily dependent on sport fishing for salmon and halibut, outdoor recreation and tourism.

The village is situated at the head of the steep-sided Tahsis Inlet (part of Nootka Sound). The inlet is protected from Pacific storms by its geography, making the docking facilities a valuable asset.

In Tahsis' heyday the population was roughly 2,500. With the closure and dismantling of the mill the population declined to 892, according to the 2001 census.

History
While First Nations peoples have inhabited the area for over 4,000 years, Europeans first visited Tahsis in 1774 (Spanish) and 1778 (English). John R. Jewitt, an English armourer, spent several winters here at the beginning of the nineteenth century as the slave of Maquinna.  Jewitt's memoirs, A Narrative of the Adventures and Sufferings of John R. Jewitt, only survivor of the crew of the ship Boston, during a captivity of nearly three years among the first nations of Nootka Sound: with an account of the manners, mode of living, and religious opinions of the natives  is a major source of information about the indigenous peoples of the Pacific Northwest Coast in general, and life in Tahsis in particular.

In the 1930s many companies tried unsuccessfully to open sawmill operations on the west coast of Vancouver Island. There were several advantages to building at Tahsis: there was a level plateau at the head of the inlet with easy deep-sea access for ocean-going vessels. The site faced southeast, getting maximum sunlight to protect the freshly cut lumber from mould due to the rains.

In 1937 Nootka Wood Products Limited started operations at what was initially called "Port Tasis", a name chosen by them in loose consultation with local First Nations.

Subsequently, a Tahsis mill was built by the Gibson Brothers in 1945.  It burned down in 1948, but in January 1949, Gibson Mills and the East Asiatic Company formed a partnership (Tahsis Company) and by April a new mill was back in production.  Before the mill was demolished, it was owned by Canadian Pacific Forest Products.

In 1962, it was reported that the Tahsis Lumber Company had "prohibited the import of all cars except one very small [un-named] German make" but that motorists "have one advantage over most: since their cars run only on private property they don't need a license".

Tahsis remained a company town until it was incorporated as a municipality in 1970.  Tahsis was connected to Gold River by the Head Bay Road in 1972.  Until that time the village was accessible only by boat or aircraft.

Climate

Demographics 

First Nations
The members of the Mowachaht/Muchalaht, Nuchatlaht and Ehattesaht First Nations are the Nuu-chah-nulth-speaking tribes whose traditional territories included all of the area known today as Nootka Sound. The Nootka Sound First Nations' territories are bounded on the north by those of the Kyuquot/Cheklesahht, and on the south by those of the Hesquiaht. Archaeological evidence confirms the occupation of the region for over 4,200 years.

Events
 The Great Walk (June) 
 Tahsis Days (July)

See also
Gold River
Strathcona Provincial Park

References

External links

Ports and harbours of British Columbia
Villages in British Columbia
Northern Vancouver Island
Populated places in the Strathcona Regional District
Nootka Sound region